GUMIL Filipinas (Gunglo dagiti Mannurat nga Ilokano iti Filipinas) or Ilokano Writers Association of the Philippines, is one of the most active group of regional writers in the Philippines. It has hundreds of active writer-members in provincial and municipal chapters as well as in overseas chapters in the mainland U.S. and Hawaii and in Greece.

History

The first Iloko writers' organizations was organized in 1923 when 37 writers organized the Gimong dagiti Umiiluko (Association of Iloko Writers) in San Fernando, La Union, spearheaded by Cornelio Valdez, a poet and founder of the Northern Luzon College in the capital town. Mena Pecson Crisologo was elected president. When Crisologo died, Ignacio Villamor became president in an election at the Instituto de Mujeres in Manila on October 8, 1927.

Benito S. de Castro, in his feature article in Bannawag magazine on February 29, 1988, said the Gimong dagiti Mannurat nga Ilokano (Ilokano Writers Association) was also organized in 1947 with Benjamin A. Gray elected as president. Its main purpose was to preserve Iloko, to encourage and improve how to write better Iloko, and to publish the members' best Iloko writings.

In the 1960s, Kutibeng (Lyre), an association of Iloko writers in Manila and suburbs, was organized. Pacifico D. Espanto was elected president.

But Kutibeng did not last long. Guillermo R Andaya, then secretary, accepted the literary editorship of Bannawag. Espanto, the president, was appointed to teach in U.P. Los Baños, Laguna. Benjamin L. Viernes, the vice-president, focused on radio broadcasting. Paul B. Zafaralla, a member of the Board of Directors, was also appointed as instructor in U.P. Los Baños where he eventually became chairman of the humanities department. The interest of the remaining board members, including Jose A. Bragado and Leonardo Q. Belen, waned.

In October 1964, Gunglo dagiti Mannurat iti Iluko (Association of Iloko Writers) was organized in Ilocos Sur. Pelagio A. Alcantara, then a public school principal, was elected president. Its first project was a literary seminar-workshop in Sta. Maria, Ilocos Sur.

After a few years, Juan S.P. Hidalgo, Jr., a staff member of Bannawag, suggested a change in name to Gunglo dagiti Mannurat nga Ilokano to enable Ilokano writers in Iloko, English, Spanish and other languages to become members.

GUMIL La Union was itself organized in 1966, with Joven Costales as its first president. That same year, GUMIL Abra was also born, with Pacita C. Saludes as president, as was GUMIL Laoag, with Peter La. Julian elected president. In December 1966, GUMIL Manila was organized, with Dr. Hermogenes. F. Belen of La Union, then vice-president for academic affairs and dean of graduate studies of the Philippine College of Arts and Trades, as president.

In 1967, GUMIL Pangasinan was organized, with Mauro F. Guico, a public school principal, as president.

On October 19, 1968, GUMIL Filipinas (Ilokano Writers Association of the Philippines) was organized in Baguio. Arturo M. Padua, then municipal mayor of Sison, Pangasinan, was elected president. The officers took their oath of office before President Ferdinand E. Marcos.

GUMIL Filipinas or Gunglo dagiti Mannurat nga Ilokano iti Filipinas, Inc., was incorporated and registered with the Philippine Securities and Exchange Commission on January 8, 1977.

Objectives
GUMIL Filipinas' main objectives are:

To provide a forum in which Ilokano writers can undertake common and cooperative efforts to improve their craft of writing literary, historical, research and other works;
To enrich Ilokano literature and cultural heritage as phases of the national identity by encouraging the members to concentrate on writing extensively and intensively about the social, economic, cultural and other aspects of growth and development among the Ilokanos through literature, history, research, or the like;
To publish books of poetry, short stories, essays, novels, historical accounts, research and critical studies, and other writings; and
To assist each member in pursuing his/her writing career and in fulfilling his life as a member of Philippines society.

Incumbent officers

2015-2017

President: Arthur P. Urata Sr.
Vice President: Mario T. Tejada
Secretary-General: Ariel S. Tabag
Treasurer: Eden C. Bulong
Auditor: Estela Bisquera-Guerrero
Business Manager: Eliseo B. Contillo Sr.
Public Relations Officer: Neyo Mario E. Valdez

Board of Directors:
 Freddie Pa. Masuli
 Vilmer V. Viloria
 Roy V. Aragon
 Aileen R. Rambaud
 Anna Liza M. Gaspar
 Remy N. Albano
 Villamor Visaya Jr.
 Danilo A. Bautista

Chapters
Provincial
 GUMIL Ilocos Norte
 GUMIL Ilocos Sur
 GUMIL La Union
 GUMIL Abra
 GUMIL Pangasinan
 GUMIL Cagayan
 GUMIL Isabela
 GUMIL Nueva Vizcaya
 GUMIL Quirino
 GUMIL Benguet
GUMIL Metro Manila

Overseas
 GUMIL Hawaii
 GUMIL Oahu
 GUMIL Maui
 GUMIL California
 GUMIL Guam
 GUMIL Greece

Balikas
Balikas is the official publication of GUMIL Filipinas. Published fortnightly, some issues of Balikas are available through its online edition.

See also
Ilokano literature
Ilokano writers
Literature of the Philippines

References
 Iloko Literature: Its Development and Promise. LINGKA An Anthology of Iloko Literature in English, GUMIL Metro Manila, Makati City, 1994

External links
GUMIL Filipinas - official website
GUMIL Filipinas Constitution and By-laws
dadapilan.com - Iloko literature portal featuring original Iloko works by Ilokano writers and a forum for Iloko literary study, criticism and online workshop.

Filipino writers' organizations
Ilocano language